Table tennis at the 2016 Summer Paralympics in Rio took place in September 2016. 276 athletes – 174 men and 102 women – are scheduled to compete in 29 events. Table tennis events have been held at the Paralympics since the first Games in Rome in 1960. Team events will feature contests consisting of one doubles and two singles matches.

Events
Twenty-nine events will be contested. The events are men's and women's team and individual competitions for the various disability classifications.

Medal table

Medalists

Men's events

Women's events

See also
Table tennis at the 2016 Summer Olympics

References

 
2016 Summer Paralympics events
2016
Table tennis competitions in Brazil
2016 in table tennis